Våk is a village in the municipality of Våler, Østfold, Norway. Its population (2005) is 1,021.

References

Villages in Østfold